Environmental testing is the measurement of the performance of equipment under specified environmental conditions, such as:

 extremely high and low temperatures
 large, swift variations in temperature
 blown and settling sand and dust
 salt spray and salt fog
 very high or low humidity
 wet environments, waterproofness, icing
 presence of corrosive material
 fungus, fluids susceptibility
 vibrations (airborne and structural), gun fire
 accelerations
 solar radiation
 high and low pressures (especially for aeronautical and space equipment)
 operating at angles (especially for marine, aeronautical and space equipment)
 electromagnetic interference (EMI), ESD, Lightning
 acoustic measurements
 power input variations

Such tests are most commonly performed on equipment used in military, maritime, aeronautical and space applications. See Environmental test chambers for more information about environmental testing equipment.

Environmental test standards include
 MIL-STD-810, "Test Method Standard for Environmental Engineering Considerations and Laboratory Tests", presently (2010) version G, issued in 2009
 MIL-HDBK-2036, "Preparation of Electronic Equipment Specifications", issued 1999
 IEC 60068, "Environmental Testing", with many parts.
 IEC 60945, "Maritime navigation and radiocommunication equipment and systems – General requirements – Methods of testing and required test results", issued 2002 and due for review in 2007
 RTCA DO-160, "Environmental Conditions and Test Procedures for Airborne Equipment", first published in 1975
 MIL-STD-461, "Department of Defense Interface Standard: Requirements for the Control of Electromagnetic Interference Characteristics of Subsystems and Equipment (11 DEC 2015)", presently version G.

See also 
 Environmental stress screening
 Environmental test chambers
 Direct Field Acoustic Testing
 Technischer Überwachungsverein

 
Environmental technology
Reliability engineering